Domenico Corvi (1721–1803) was an Italian painter at the close of the 18th century, active in an early Neoclassic style in Rome and surrounding sites.

Biography
Corvi was born in Viterbo. After some early works in Viterbo and Palestrina, Corvi moved on to Rome to work under Francesco Mancini, working in a Roman milieu where late-Rococo of Pompeo Batoni and the incipient Neoclassicism of Anton Raphael Mengs coexisted, and fashioned a style in between. His first major set of independent works in Rome were a series of canvases completed in 1758 and currently in Vedana, commissioned by the Cardinal Domenico Amedeo Orsini and including the altarpiece of St Michael Archangel for the church of Trinità dei Monti.

In 1756, along with Vincenzo Strigelli and Anton Angelo Falaschi, he frescoed the Viterbese Oratorio del Gonfalone.  The patronage of the Antonelli family gained him the commission for three altarpieces (1754 and 1756) for the church of Senigallia.  He also painted for the Church of Saint Marcello, and a series of historical canvases for Palazzo Barberini.

In 1770-78 Corvi frescoed ceilings for the Palazzo Doria Pamphilj and Borghese Palace. In the Borghese villa he frescoed a Triumph of Apollo (1771) and an Aurora (1782).  Again for the Borghese family, he helped restore the Capella Paolina in Santa Maria Maggiore and the Loggia of Lanfranco in the casino. 
He also painted for the Church of San Marco and the Palazzo dei Conservatori.

In 1774-1778 Corvi completed a canvas cycle for a Swiss Abbey in Solothurn, Switzerland, now apparently housed in the Cathedral of St Ursus in the town.

Corvi joined the artists’ Accademia dell'Arcadia. He painted The Miracle of Saint Joseph Calasanz Resuscitating a Child in a Church at Frascati for the order of Piarists (Scolopi); the painting was made to commemorate the canonization of the saint on July 16, 1767, and is now in the Wadsworth Atheneum. The Charity of St. Thomas of Villanova was painted in 1795 for the Church of SS. Trinità of Viterbo.

Among his pupils were Francesco Alberi and Vincenzo Camuccini.

Corvi died in 1803 in Rome.

References

Renaissance to Rococo; Masterpieces from the collection of the Wadsworth Atheneum Museum of Art. Edited by Eric Zafran. (2004) Yale University Press. New Haven and London. pp90–91.
https://web.archive.org/web/20060607072926/http://www.italica.rai.it/index.php?categoria=biografie&scheda=corvi

1721 births
1803 deaths
18th-century Italian people
Rococo painters
Italian neoclassical painters
18th-century Italian painters
Italian male painters
19th-century Italian painters
People from Viterbo
19th-century Italian male artists
18th-century Italian male artists